Apollon Smyrnis is a Greek professional football team formed in 1891. The club first entered the Greek Football Cup in the 1931–1932 season. The club also was a founding member of the Athens Football Clubs Association in 1924, where they played until they qualified for the Panhellenic Championship.

Throughout its history the club's first team has competed in various national and international competitions. All players who have played in 50 or more such matches are listed below.

Key
Players with name in bold currently play for the club.
Years are the first and last calendar years in which the player appeared in competitive first-team football for the club.
League appearances and goals comprise those in the Gamma Ethniki, Beta Ethniki and the Alpha Ethniki.
Total appearances and goals comprise those in the Gamma Ethniki, Beta Ethniki and Alpha Ethniki, Greek Football Cup, Greek Super Cup, and several now-defunct competitions.

Players with 50 or more appearances
Appearances and goals are for first-team competitive matches only. Substitute appearances are included. Statistics are correct as of 8 November 2009.

Position key:
GK – Goalkeeper; 
DF – Defender;
MF – Midfielder;
FW – Forward

References
General
Greece Final Tables at RSSSF.

Specific

List
Apollon Smyrnis
Association football player non-biographical articles